Fort Ransom State Park is a public recreation area located in the Sheyenne River Valley two miles north of the town of Fort Ransom in Ransom County, North Dakota. The state park preserves two homesteader farms: the Bjone House and the Andrew Sunne farm. The park is a featured site on the Sheyenne River Valley National Scenic Byway.

Activities and amenities
The park features a visitors center with displays that interpret the lives of the area's 19th-century sodbusters and the Mound Builders who lived here from 5000 to 8000 years ago. Over  of trails are available for hikers, bikers, equestrians, skiers, and snowshoers. The park also offers campsites and lodging, canoe and kayak rentals, picnicking facilities, and group facilities in the Sodbuster Building.

References

External links

Fort Ransom State Park North Dakota Parks and Recreation Department
Fort Ransom State Park Map North Dakota Parks and Recreation Department

State parks of North Dakota
Protected areas established in 1976
1976 establishments in North Dakota
Protected areas of Ransom County, North Dakota
Museums in Ransom County, North Dakota